The Labor Center is a research and extension department at the University of California Los Angeles focused on organized labor and labor rights. It was created in 1964 as the Center for Labor Research and Education and is a unit of the UCLA Institute for Research on Labor and Employment.

History
As organized labor in the U.S. reached its height of influence after the Second World War, the University of California Los Angeles and the University of Berkeley, California created industrial relations programs under the initiative of Governor Earl Warren. The Institutes were tasked with outreach to both employers and trade unions, but by the 1960s Labor felt itself the junior partner in the arrangement. An agreement between the California AFL-CIO and the University of California led in 1964 to the founding of Centers for Labor Research and Education at UCLA and UC Berkeley focusing on issues such as job displacement, the needs of white collar unions, reducing hours of work, and the problems of unemployment. In 2002, the Labor Center opened a downtown location overlooking MacArthur Park in a building that was formerly a union hall. The Downtown Labor Center has supported groups such as the National Day Labor Organization Network, the California Construction Academy, and the Los Angeles Black Worker Center. The Labor Center is also home to the Dream Resource Center, an action research center focusing on issues of immigrant integration, particularly related to undocumented youth. Labor Center research has led to county and state actions to mitigate wage theft.

Publications

References

External links 

 

Labor Center
Labor relations in the United States
Labor studies organizations based in the United States